Yara Kakish (born 21 August 1991) is a Jordanian female ju-jitsu practitioner. Her husband Basel Fanous is also a ju-jitsu practitioner and has represented Jordan in international competitive events.

She represented Jordan at the 2018 Asian Games and claimed a bronze medal in the women's 62kg ne-waza event.

References 

1991 births
Living people
Jordanian female martial artists
Ju-jitsu practitioners at the 2018 Asian Games
Medalists at the 2018 Asian Games
Asian Games bronze medalists for Jordan
Sportspeople from Amman
Asian Games medalists in ju-jitsu
21st-century Jordanian women